Steromphala nivosa, common name the Maltese top shell, is a species of sea snail, a marine gastropod mollusk in the family Trochidae, the top snails.

Description
The size of the shell varies between 6 mm and 9 mm. The umbilicate shell has an orbiculate-conoidal shape. It is gray with almost round spots. It is sulcate in a crosswise direction and longitudinally substriate. The aperture is almost round. The columella is flexuous. The base of the shell is rounded.

Distribution
This species occurs in the Mediterranean Sea off Malta.

References

Further reading
 Nordsieck F., 1982: Die europäischen Meeres-Gehäuseschnecken. 2. Auflage. * Gustav Fischer, Stuttgart; 539 pp., 38 pl.
 Smriglio C., Mariottini P. & Gravina F., 1991: Nota su alcune specie del genere Gibbula Risso, 1826 ex Leach ms; Bollettino Malacologico 27 (5–9): 61–75
 Gofas, S.; Le Renard, J.; Bouchet, P. (2001). Mollusca, in: Costello, M.J. et al. (Ed.) (2001). European register of marine species: a check-list of the marine species in Europe and a bibliography of guides to their identification. Collection Patrimoines Naturels, 50: pp. 180–213

External links
 
 Adams A., 1851: An arrangement of Stomatellidae, including the characters of a new genus, and of several new species; Proceedings of the Zoological Society of London 18: 29–40
 Monterosato T. A. (di), 1888–1889: Molluschi del Porto di Palermo. Specie e varietà ; Bullettino della Società Malacologica Italiana, Pisa, 13 (1888[1889?): 161–180 14 (1889): 75–81]
 Affenzeller S., Haar N. & Steiner G. (2017). Revision of the genus complex Gibbula: an integrative approach to delineating the Eastern Mediterranean genera Gibbula Risso, 1826, Steromphala Gray, 1847, and Phorcus Risso, 1826 using DNA-barcoding and geometric morphometrics (Vetigastropoda, Trochoidea). Organisms Diversity & Evolution. 17(4): 789-812

nivosa
Gastropods described in 1851